William Shand (1902–1997) was a Scottish-born Argentine poet, novelist and playwright. Arriving in Argentina in 1938, he worked for La Nación as a book reviewer, translator and critic. Shand translated the poetry of John Donne and Stephen Spender and was a playwright of multiple works, including the libretto for the opera Beatrix Cenci  of Alberto Ginastera. Collaborating with Alberto Girri, they compiled other poets' works into collected editions. Characterized as "a careful observer of contemporary Argentine society" Shand "... often dealt with highly controversial and delicate topics". He split his time between an apartment opposite Plazoleta Carlos Pellegrini and a villa in San Miguel.

Selected works
 Teatro (1967)
 Judith y el gangster (1967)
 Selected poems (1978)
 Una extraña jornada (1978)
 Las andanzas de Rubino (1983)

Recognition
1984, Merit Diploma of Translation, Konex Foundation
1994, Merit Diploma of Translation, Konex Foundation
Premio Fondo Nacional del Arte 
Premo Municipal 
Faja de HOnor de la S.A.D.E

References

1902 births
1997 deaths
Writers from Glasgow
20th-century Scottish novelists
Scottish male novelists
Scottish dramatists and playwrights
British emigrants to Argentina
20th-century Argentine poets
Argentine male novelists
British male novelists
Argentine dramatists and playwrights
Argentine translators
Argentine journalists
Male journalists
20th-century British male writers
20th-century Scottish poets
Scottish male poets
20th-century British novelists
20th-century British dramatists and playwrights
Writers from Buenos Aires
Opera librettists
20th-century translators
British male dramatists and playwrights
20th-century journalists
English–Spanish translators